Wiggenhall St Germans is a village and civil parish in the English county of Norfolk in the East of England.

The parish is situated on the River Great Ouse which divides the village into two parts. Most of the parish lies below the high-water mark and some areas are level with the bed of the river, which is confined by high banks.
The parish includes the hamlets of Wiggenhall St Mary the Virgin and Wiggenhall St Peter and the settlements of Eau Brink and Saddlebow. It was the site of Fitton, the ancient seat of the Howard family, later the dukes of Norfolk;  their former hall of 1570-77 is now  the Grade II* listed building Fitton Oake. The parish has a Good Ofsted-rated Primary School, (March 2016).

The villages name means 'Wicga's nook of land'.

St German's Church  is a Grade I  listed building. St Mary the Virgin's Church, also Grade I, is under the care of the Churches Conservation Trust. The ruined St Peter's Church is a Grade II* listed building.

History 
During WWII two Hawker Hurricanes collided over the parish. The crash site was investigated by a local local aviation society and a book published.

Governance
Wiggenhall St Germans is part of the electoral ward called Wiggenhall. The population of this ward at the 2011 Census was 2,102.

See also
Wiggenhall St Germans SSSI
Wiggenhall St Mary Magdalen
St Germain's railway station

References

External links

Villages in Norfolk
Civil parishes in Norfolk
King's Lynn and West Norfolk